Agrius godarti is a moth in the family Sphingidae which is found inland in the northern half of Australia, including Queensland and New South Wales.

They have a wingspan of about 80 mm. It is similar to Agrius convolvuli, but there is slight sexual dimorphism (the forewing of the female is paler than that of the male), the lateral abdominal spots are buff (not pink) and the hindwing upperside pale bands are buff (not grey). The median band is single and narrow.

References

Agrius (moth)
Moths described in 1826
Moths of Australia